Jan Alfred Szczepański (9 November 1902 in Kraków – 20 March 1991 in Warsaw) was a Polish journalist, theatre critic and mountaineer.

1902 births
1991 deaths
Journalists from Kraków
Polish mountain climbers
Polish film critics
Polish theatre critics
Burials at Rakowicki Cemetery
Jagiellonian University alumni